Pouteria congestifolia is a species of plant in the family Sapotaceae. It is found in Costa Rica and Panama.

References

congestifolia
Vulnerable plants
Taxonomy articles created by Polbot